Martin Hoffmann or Martin Hoffman may refer to:

Spelled "Martin Hofmann" 

 Martin Hofmann (born 1978), Czech actor

Spelled "Martin Hoffmann"
 Martin Hoffmann (luthier) (1653–1719), German luthier
 Martin Hoffmann (footballer) (born 1955), German footballer and manager
 Martin Richard Hoffmann (1932–2014), United States Secretary of the Army 1975-77
 9521 Martinhoffmann, an extraterrestrial minor planet

Spelled "Martin Hoffman"
 Martin Hoffman, psychology professor
 Martin Hoffman (painter), 18th-century German painter, known for his portrait of Linnaeus
 Martin Hoffman (bridge) (1929–2018), Czech-born British bridge player and writer
 Martin Hoffman, the writer of the music for the 1948 Woody Guthrie song "Deportee (Plane Wreck at Los Gatos)"